Nyoka the Jungle Girl is a fictional character created for the screen in the 1941 serial Jungle Girl, starring Frances Gifford as Nyoka Meredith. After the initial film, Nyoka appeared in comic books published by Fawcett, Charlton, and AC Comics.

Tina Turner stated that when she and Ike Turned began performing together Ike wanted her to act wild on stage emulating Nyoka the Jungle Girl.

Character background 
The short story that led to the creation of Nyoka was "The Land of Hidden Men" by Edgar Rice Burroughs in the May 1931 issue of Blue Book. The short story was later expanded into the lost world novel Jungle Girl, published in 1932. The novel is set in Cambodia, and the main character is an Asian princess called Fou-tan. Aside from living in a jungle region, she bears no relation to the later Nyoka character, a white woman living in Africa.

The Jungle Girl serial is officially based on the Burroughs story "Jungle Girl", although there is no character named Nyoka and no Nyoka-like character in the original story. The movie's credits list Burroughs along with six other writers, but his input on creating the film character was obviously minimal, because the studio later was able to use the name "Nyoka" in a sequel without crediting Burroughs at all.

Publication history 
Jungle Girl was popular enough to inspire a sequel: the 1942 serial Perils of Nyoka, starring Kay Aldridge as Nyoka Gordon. Besides the surname, some other details about the character are also changed slightly.

In other media

Comic books
Fawcett Comics used the film version of Nyoka as the basis for Jungle Girl comics. Issue #1 appeared in 1942; the character appeared irregularly until 1953, when Fawcett ceased publication.

According to Jess Nevins' Encyclopedia of Golden Age Superheroes, "Nyoka fights a variety of criminals including gorillas with human brains and Vulture, the queen of a band of Arabian outlaws, whose bodyguard is a giant gorilla named Satan".

Nyoka was one of the intellectual properties sold to Charlton Comics by Fawcett in the 1950s after the National Comics Publications v. Fawcett Publications lawsuit. Her first Charlton appearance was in Nyoka, Jungle Girl #14 (November 1955). Her final Charlton appearance was issue #22 (November 1957).

Once Charlton Comics ceased publication, Nyoka's rights were sold again. AC Comics purchased the rights from Charlton in 1987. Nyoka appeared in AC Comics' The Further Adventures of Nyoka the Jungle Girl; there were five issues printed between 1988 and 1989, consisting mostly of reprints and movie stills. Nyoka has since appeared in other AC Comics' titles.

References

External links 
 
 Nyoka the Jungle Girl at the Toonopedia
 Republic Studio's 1941 Jungle Girl

Edgar Rice Burroughs characters
Jungle girls
Jungle superheroes
Film serial characters
Female characters in literature
Female characters in film
Female characters in comics
Golden Age adventure heroes